Benjamin Van Doren Hedges, Jr. (June 8, 1907 - December 31, 1969) was an American athlete who competed mainly in the high jump. He graduated from Princeton University in 1930.

He competed for the United States in the 1928 Summer Olympics held in Amsterdam, Netherlands in the high jump where he won the silver medal, clearing 1.91 meters (6' 3-1/4"). Prior to graduating from Princeton in 1930, Ben Hedges won the IC4A high jump in 1929 With his second place in the 1928 high jump, Hedges is the last Princetonian to have won an Olympic track & field medal. In 1931, Hedges joined Bankers Trust Co. as a personnel administrator and later became executive vice-president of the Big Brother Movement. He was also a war hero, winning 13 Battle Stars and receiving a Presidential Unit Citation for his work in the Pacific as an air combat intelligence officer.

See also
List of Princeton University Olympians

References

American male high jumpers
Princeton University alumni
Olympic silver medalists for the United States in track and field
Athletes (track and field) at the 1928 Summer Olympics
1969 deaths
1907 births
Medalists at the 1928 Summer Olympics
Loomis Chaffee School alumni